ITA Airways has commenced operations on 15 October 2021, planning to serve 44 destinations in 2021 and to grow to 74 destinations by 2025. In fact, in 2022 it increased the destinations to 64, in Italy, Europe, North Africa, Asia, North and South America. Thanks to the code-share agreements, on the ITA Airways website,  you can book direct flights anywhere in the world.

Destinations
This list of ITA Airways destinations includes the city, country, and the airport's name, with the airline's hubs marked.

References 

Italia Trasporto Aereo
Lists of airline destinations
Italia Trasporto Aereo